Pope John XIV (died 20 August 984), born Pietro Canepanova, was the bishop of Rome and ruler of the Papal States from November 983 until his death.

Early career
Canepanova was born at Pavia. He was bishop of Pavia and served as imperial archchancellor for Italy of Emperor Otto II.  His earliest document in that capacity dates from 28 December 980, and the latest from 27 August 983.

Pontificate
Pope Benedict VII died in 983. Empresses Adelaide and Theophanu, Otto II's mother and wife respectively, wished to enthrone Majolus of Cluny as the new pope, but he refused, and Pietro Canepanova was chosen instead. Canepanova took the papal name John XIV to avoid being linked to Saint Peter.

Otto II died shortly after his election, his heir Otto III, being only 3 years old and unable to protect John's position. Antipope Boniface VII, on the strength of the popular feeling against the new pope, returned from Constantinople and placed John XIV in prison in the Castel Sant'Angelo, where he died either from starvation or poison.

References

Sources

 

Popes
Italian popes
Religious leaders from Pavia
Deaths by starvation
984 deaths
Year of birth unknown
10th-century popes
Burials at St. Peter's Basilica